Sharpe James (born February 20, 1936) is an American Democratic politician from New Jersey, who served as State Senator for the 29th Legislative District and was 37th Mayor of Newark, New Jersey. James was the second African American Mayor of Newark and served five four-year terms before declining to run for re-election. He is a subject of the movie Street Fight which depicts the controversial  methods Sharpe used to undermine the campaign of Cory Booker, who challenged the incumbent mayor in 2002. From June 1999 until July 2006, James simultaneously served as Mayor of Newark and New Jersey State Senator. He declined to run for re-election to the State Senate in 2007; his term as Senator  expired in January 2008. On April 16, 2008, James was convicted of five counts of fraud by a federal jury and was subsequently sentenced to 27 months in prison.

Prior to politics, James worked as a teacher, athletic director and professor at Essex County College.

Education 
James earned a B.A. in education from Montclair State University and a M.A. in physical education from Springfield College. He received the 1961 Department of Physiology Award from that school, and later completed postgraduate studies at Washington State University, Columbia University, and Rutgers University. He also served with the U.S. Army in Germany. In 1988, James was awarded an Honorary Doctor of Laws degree from Montclair State University, and, in 1991, an Honorary Doctorate from Drew University.

Public office 
Sharpe James was first elected to public office in 1970 as South Ward Councilman. He was first elected Mayor of Newark on May 13, 1986, and was sworn into office on July 1 of that year. He was the first Newark mayor to run unopposed when he sought re-election in 1990 and handily won re-election in 1994 and 1998. Sharpe James became Newark's longest-serving mayor when he was re-elected for an unprecedented fifth term in 2002, a year after being named Mayor of the Year by the New Jersey Conference of Mayors.

In December 1992, James was a member of the New Jersey State Electoral College, one of 15 electors casting their votes for the Clinton/Gore ticket.

In June 1999, while serving as Mayor, James was appointed to the New Jersey Senate to fill out the unexpired term of the late Senator Wynona Lipman, and won election to that seat the following November. He was re-elected for a full term in November 2001 and continued to hold both offices.  His Senate district encompassed part of Newark in Essex County and all of the Township of Hillside in Union County.

Sharpe James became known in his early years as mayor for often wearing jogging suits in public and making high-profile efforts to attract development to Downtown Newark.  In 1997, Newark saw the completion of the acclaimed New Jersey Performing Arts Center.  In 2006, James championed the relocation of the New Jersey Devils to the City of Newark. The Prudential Center is the newest arena in the Newark metropolitan area.

In terms of housing, James' policy in the 1990s was to demolish Newark's massive, but mostly abandoned, housing projects, and replace them with small-scale public housing or market rate middle class residences.

Political life 
In 1986, James challenged and defeated Kenneth A. Gibson, Newark's first African American mayor.

James then became known as an example of "machine politics". He had a reputation for questionable campaign tactics, including alleged use of the police force for his own purposes, intimidating supporters of his opponents and attacking his opponents' heritage. His final reelection campaign, against then-Councilman Cory Booker in 2002, was documented in the 2005 feature film Street Fight.

On March 16, 2006, James filed for reelection as mayor, but announced eleven days later he would not seek a sixth term.

On April 9, 2007, James announced he would not seek re-election to his State Senate seat.

In 2013, Sharpe advised the election campaign of his son John Sharpe James, who won a seat on the Municipal Council of Newark.

Sharpe also endorsed Cory Booker, a former foe he had defeated in the 2002 Newark mayoral race, in the special election for U.S. Senator to replace the late Frank Lautenberg.

In 2022, James was attempting to run for office as an at-large candidate for Newark City Council despite a court order banning him from running a public elected office. His certification was denied by Newark City Clerk Kenneth Louis on March 3, 2022. James threatened a lawsuit if the city denies his candidacy.

Fraud conviction 
On April 16, 2008, Sharpe James was convicted on five counts of fraud by a federal jury for conspiring to rig the sale of nine city lots to his mistress, who quickly resold them for hundreds of thousands of dollars in profit. James served his two-year prison sentence in a federal prison camp in Petersburg, Virginia.

James's co-defendant and former girlfriend, Tamika Riley, was also found guilty on those five counts and eight others, including tax evasion. After 18 months in prison, James was released on April 6, 2010. While in prison, he wrote a 17-chapter book titled Political Prisoner.

James appealed his convictions and in September 2010, one of the five convictions was overturned. The four remaining convictions were left unchanged. He further appealed seeking to overturn the convictions due to a juror being dishonest; this appeal was dismissed in 2013.

See also
 2002 Newark mayoral election
 List of mayors of Newark, New Jersey

References

External links
 as Sharpe James

|-

1936 births
African-American mayors in New Jersey
African-American state legislators in New Jersey
Living people
Mayors of Newark, New Jersey
Montclair State University alumni
Members of the Municipal Council of Newark
New Jersey politicians convicted of crimes
Democratic Party New Jersey state senators
Politicians from Jacksonville, Florida
Springfield College (Massachusetts) alumni
Politicians convicted of program bribery
Politicians convicted of mail and wire fraud
New Jersey politicians convicted of corruption
African-American city council members in New Jersey
21st-century African-American people
20th-century African-American people